The 1944 Morgan State Bears football team was an American football team that represented Morgan State College in the Colored Intercollegiate Athletic Association (CIAA) during the 1944 college football season. In their 16th season under head coach Edward P. Hurt, the Bears compiled a 6–1 record, won the CIAA championship, shut out five of seven opponents, and outscored all opponents by a total of 218 to 5. The Bears were recognized as the 1944 black college national champion.

Schedule

References

Morgan State
Morgan State Bears football seasons
Black college football national champions
Morgan State Bears football